Edgemont Village is a neighbourhood within the District of North Vancouver, in British Columbia, Canada. It is situated between several converging suburbs, centering on the intersection of Edgemont Blv and Highland Blv, where it is a minor residential and commercial center for local communities.

According to the District of North Vancouver's Official Community Plan, Edgemont Village encompasses the shops and tenements along and immediately surrounding Edgemont Blv between W Queens Rd and Ridgewood Dr. However, it is broadly recognized as taking up much of the hillside plateau between the Mckay and Mosquito creeks, bordering Ridgewood Dr to the north and the Upper Levels Highway to the south.

While the City of North Vancouver continues to be the North Shore's primary commercial and residential center, Edgemont Village serves as a village center for its surrounding neighbourhoods. It is one of six such village centers (Lion’s Gate, Edgemont, Queensdale, Maplewood, Parkgate, and Deep Cove) in the District of North Vancouver. Edgemont's commercial core consists of many small or local businesses and services to meet most daily needs; a range of eclectic shops; and district amenities, including the North Vancouver District Public Library (Capilano Branch) and Highlands United Church. The area is also home to many examples of mid-century "west coast modernism" architecture.

Transportation 
Along with the rest of the district, much of the development in Edgemont Village has occurred primarily in the 1950s and 60s, and so has largely been autocentric. Despite recent projects having consisted of mixed-use development and pedestrian oriented infrastructure, vehicles remain the primary method of transportation within and without the district, especially for commuters residing in any one of the several bedroom communities which converge upon the village, wherefor Edgemont is the only such village center in this North-West quadrant of the district. Nevertheless, the area is still served relatively well by several TransLink bus routes; 232 (Phibbs Exchange to Grouse Mountain) and 246 (Downtown to Marine & Capilano) pass through the Village.

Translink's North Shore Area Transit Plan identifies a possible frequent transit service (with frequencies of at least 15 minutes or less, all day, every day) to connect Park Royal and Lynn Valley via Edgemont Village.

Recreation 

Edgemont Village is within resting proximity of several touristy or otherwise leisurely destinations on the North Shore: the Capilano Suspension Bridge, the Capilano Salmon Hatchery, Delbrook Community Recreation Centre, Cleveland Dam, and Grouse Mountain. The village is also surrounded on three sides by forested parks, and so connects directly to several trails and other such outdoor spaces, including tennis and pickle courts, a duck pond, and several creeks.

References

External links
 Official website

Neighbourhoods in British Columbia
North Vancouver (district municipality)